The Battle of Nicopolis ad Istrum was fought between the Roman army of Emperor Decius and his son Herennius Etruscus, and the Gothic army of King Cniva, in 250 AD.  The Romans were victorious.

Prelude
In 250, the Goths, led by their king Cniva, attacked the Roman province of Moesia. Roman emperor Decius and his son Herennius Etruscus led their army to Moesia. The Goths were, at the same time, marching to attack the Roman city of Philippopolis. The Romans intercepted them near Nicopolis ad Istrum.

Battle
The Romans intercepted the Goths just before they could reach Nicopolis. Decius and Herennius launched a surprise attack on the Goths while they were marching. The Romans took the disorganized Goths by surprise, fighting hard and gaining the upper hand quickly. Caught off guard, the Goths could not respond to the attack, and so were defeated. 
 
6th century Byzantine scholar Jordanes described Cniva's defeat:When the Emperor Decius drew near, Cniva, with his army still in good shape, at last withdrew to the Balkan Mountains, which were not far distant.

Aftermath
The Romans defeated the Goths, but not decisively. Cniva's army marched in good order to besiege Philippopolis. Decius moved through the Shipka Pass to intercept him but was ambushed and heavily defeated by Cniva near Beroe at the Battle of Beroe. Decius fled to Novae to link up with governor Trebonianus Gallus. Cniva mounted failed attacks on Philippopolis' walls and then negotiated a truce with the city's ambitious governor, Titus Julius Priscus. The Goths broke the truce, however, and sacked the city. In 251 AD, Cniva defeated three Roman legions at the Battle of Abritus, and Decius and Herennius were both killed.

References

Bibliography

Footnotes

Further reading
Florus on the Germanic wars, translated by E.S. Forster, www.livius.org 2010-10.
The Germanic Wars, 2nd century, www.unrv.com 2010-10.
Roman Germanic Wars, 12 BC to 17 AD, www.heritage-history.com 2010-10.
Timeline of Ancient Europe, www.earth-history.com 2010-10.
Speidel, Michael, 2004, Ancient Germanic warriors: Warrior styles from Trajan's column to Icelandic sagas. (book)

Nicopolis ad Istrum
Nicopolis ad Istrum
Nicopolis ad Istrum
Nicopolis ad Istrum
Nicopolis ad Istrum
Bulgaria in the Roman era